Thomas James Everuss (18 October 1903 – 18 May 1979) was an Australian rules footballer who played with  in the Victorian Football League (VFL).

Early life
The son of Thomas James Everuss (1870–1933), and Margaret Priscilla Eversuss (1874–1943), née Whetter, Thomas James Everuss was born in Broken Hill on 18 October 1903.

He married Jean Isobel Glenn (1908-1967), in Broken Hill, on 29 January 1929. They had three children.

Football
After commencing his career with South Broken Hill Football Club, Everuss and his team-mate Lindsay Beck both joined  at the start of the 1926 VFL season. He made his debut against North Melbourne in Round 2; he played every game for the remainder of the season.

Fireman
Everuss returned to Broken Hill in September 1926, where he resumed his work as a fireman. He lived in South Broken Hill until he transferred to the fire station at South Bankstown where he served for twenty years. Upon retirement he moved to Umina where he lived until his death in 1979.

Death
He died at Umina Beach, New South Wales on 18 May 1979.

Notes

External links 
 
 
 Thomas James Everuss, at New South Wales Australian Football History Society.

1903 births
1979 deaths
Australian rules footballers from New South Wales
Hawthorn Football Club players
South Broken Hill Football Club players